Talmo is a town in Jackson County, Georgia, United States. The population was 257 at the 2020 census.

Talmo calls itself "The Jewel of Jackson County".

History 
"Talmo" is a name derived from the Creek language meaning "home of the Chief Tallassee". The Georgia General Assembly incorporated Talmo as a town in 1920.

Geography
Talmo is located in northwestern Jackson County at  (34.187587, -83.716387). It is bordered to the southeast by Pendergrass. U.S. Route 129 passes through the town, leading northwest  to Gainesville and southeast  to Jefferson, the Jackson county seat.

The town is drained by tributaries of the Middle Oconee River.

Demographics

As of the census of 2000, there were 477 people, 146 households, and 116 families residing in the town. The racial makeup of the town was 79.45% White, 4.19% African American, 0.21% Native American, 13.21% from other races, and 2.94% from two or more races. Hispanic or Latino people of any race were 43.82% of the population.

There were 146 households, out of which 48.6% had children under the age of 18 living with them, 61.6% were married couples living together, 7.5% had a female householder with no husband present, and 19.9% were non-families. 9.6% of all households were made up of individuals, and 2.7% had someone living alone who was 65 years of age or older.  The average household size was 3.27 and the average family size was 3.41.

In the town, the population was spread out, with 32.1% under the age of 18, 13.6% from 18 to 24, 36.9% from 25 to 44, 13.0% from 45 to 64, and 4.4% who were 65 years of age or older.  The median age was 26 years. For every 100 females, there were 119.8 males.  For every 100 females age 18 and over, there were 129.8 males.

The median income for a household in the town was $30,750, and the median income for a family was $31,442. Males had a median income of $20,938 versus $15,000 for females. The per capita income for the town was $14,256.  About 12.6% of families and 18.2% of the population were below the poverty line, including 19.3% of those under age 18 and 6.7% of those age 65 or over.

References

External links
Talmo at City-Data.com

Towns in Jackson County, Georgia
Towns in Georgia (U.S. state)